Helensburgh RFC is a rugby union side based in Helensburgh, Argyll and Bute, Scotland. They play their home games at Ardencaple.

History

The club was founded in 1963 and celebrated its golden jubilee in 2013. The event attracted 400 guests from around the world for a celebratory dinner.

Trivia

The Helensburgh rugby team made the news in 2004 when their 1st XV all became fathers in the space of 5 years; all of them together having 15 sons; enough for a new 1st XV.

The Princess Royal visited Helensburgh RFC in 2012 and opened a new stand at the ground.

Helensburgh Sevens

The club run the Helensburgh Sevens tournament.

Other Sevens

The Royal Navy host their Northern Sevens at Ardencaple. Helensburgh are allowed to participate as ground owners; however they can not represent the Royal Navy in subsequent matches. The Helensburgh side reached the final in 2017.

Honours

 Helensburgh Sevens
 Champions: 1972, 2014

References 

Rugby union in Argyll and Bute
Scottish rugby union teams
Helensburgh